Richard Jérome Orlans (born 6 October 1931) is a former Belgian footballer who played as a midfielder. He played in the Belgian First Division for the teams of K.A.A. Gent, Cercle Brugge and R.S.C. Anderlecht and played 21 games for the national team of Belgium. After his playing career, he was also a coach.

He is also the father of football manager Patrick Orlans.

Career

First Division
Born in Ghent, Orlans joined K.A.A. Gent in 1946 at the age of 15 and played in all of the youth teams. In 1949 he debuted as a midfielder in the first team of the team. He acquired a place in the permanent team in the 1950–51 season and finished in second position in the league in 1955 and three times in third position (1954, 1957 and 1958). He remained a player until 1961.

In between 1955 and 1958, the strongest era of K.A.A. Gent, Orlans played 21 games for the Belgium national team and scored five goals overall. His best game was on 3 June 1956 in the match against Hungary which was won 5–4. After 45 minutes, Hungary was winning 1–3, but in the second half, Belgium could come back and even win, with the third and fifth goals from Orlans. In the same year, Orlans finished second in the Belgian Golden Shoe vote, honouring the best player in competition. The winner was Vic Mees.

In 1961 Orlans went to the newly promoted team of Cercle Brugge and managed to ensure remaining in the Belgian First Division. He played a good season and was selected for the national team two more times, but he never played for the team.

The strong performances of Orlans for Cercle caught the eye of coach Sinibaldi of R.S.C. Anderlecht, and Orlans transferred to the Brussels team. In his first season, Orlans played a strong European campaign. In the 1962–63 European Cup he and Anderlecht reached the quarterfinals setting aside, among others, Real Madrid. In the next season, he was Belgian champion with the team. After this, he ended his time in the First Division. He played 320 games all together and scored 50 goals.

Lower levels
Later on, Orlans played at a lower level for the team of SK Roeselare in the Third Division (1964–1965). He performed as a player-coach for the team of Zwevegem Sport in the Third Division (1965–1969) and afterwards again at SK Roeselare (1969–71).

After he obtained his coaching certificate at the coaching school at the Heizel in 1970, Orlans became a coach at AS Oostende in the Belgian Second Division (1971–1972), a job he did not complete, as he resigned. He left for Excelsior Moeskroen but could not prevent relegation to the Belgian Fourth Division. Orlans returned to Zwevegem Sport in the Fourth Division and acted as player-coach for two more seasons. (1972–1974)

In 1974, Orlans became the coach of K.A.A. Gent, which in the meantime had fallen to the Belgian Third Division. In his first season, he helped the club win promotion to the Second Division, and he stayed for one year longer. In 1976 Orlans applied to succeed the national coach Raymond Goethals, but it was Guy Thys who became the new coach of the national team. After this, Orlans was coach of RRC Gent for two more seasons in the Fourth Division, and he shortly became the national coach of Zaire in 1982.

References

External links
Richard Orlans website

1931 births
Living people
Footballers from Ghent
Association football midfielders
Belgian footballers
Belgian football managers
Belgium international footballers
K.R.C. Gent managers